The Sappony are a state-recognized tribe in North Carolina. They claim descent from the historic Saponi people, an Eastern Siouan language-speaking tribe who occupied the Piedmont of North Carolina and Virginia. 

They were previously called the Indians of Person County. They are based in Roxboro, the seat of Person County, North Carolina.

The Sappony are not federally recognized as a Native American tribe and have never petitioned for federal recognition.

Nonprofit organization 
In 1996, the Sappony formed a 501(c)(3) nonprofit organization named the High Plains Indians.

In 2018, Dante Desiderio served as the High Plains Indians' Executive Director and Charlene Martin served as the treasurer.

Administration 
In 2021, the administration of the Sappony were as follows.
 Otis K. Martin, tribal chief
 Dorothy Stewart Crowe, board chairperson
 Charlene Y. Martin, treasurer
 Juila Martin Phipps, secretary
 Danta Desiderio, executive director.

See also
 Haliwa-Saponi Indian Tribe
 Occaneechi Band of the Saponi Nation

Notes

References

External links
 
 North Carolina Commission of Indian Affairs

Cultural organizations based in North Carolina
Native American tribes in North Carolina
Native American history of North Carolina
Non-profit organizations based in North Carolina
State-recognized tribes in the United States